Boris Kopitović is a Montenegrin footballer who plays as a forward for Singaporean club Tampines Rovers.

Club career

OFK Petrovac 
Kopitović started his career with OFK Petrovac. During his time with Petrovac, he was named the revelation of the 2015/2016 in the Montenegrin First League, scoring 13 goals and earning a transfer to Mladost (OFK Titograd).

Return to OFK Petrovac 
Kopitović returned to Petrovac after 2 seasons away where he was unable to replicate the form that saw him transferring to Mladost. In total, since he left Petrovac, he had only managed to score 7 for Mladost and just a solitary goal for FK Kom.

Entering the winter break, Kopitović was the second top-scorer in the Montenegro top tier with 8 goals from 19 appearances for the 2019/2020 Montenegrin First League, before he decided to transfer to Singapore Premier League side Tampines Rovers FC.

Tampines Rovers 
Kopitović signed for Tampines Rovers FC for the 2020 Singapore Premier League season and opened his goal scoring account on his debut, netting in a 5-3 defeat to Bali United F.C. in the 2020 AFC Champions League qualifying play-offs. He scored in his second competitive game as well, helping the Stags to a 2-1 victory over PSM Makassar in the 2020 AFC Cup opener. Kopitović has enjoyed a brilliant start to life in Singapore, scoring 5 goals in his first 5 appearances for the Stags, in friendlies and continental competitions, ahead of the season opener on 21 Feb 2020.

Kopitovic won his first silverware with the Stags in the 2020 Singapore Community Shield, scoring in a 3-0 win over Hougang United.

Kopitovic continued his fine start for the Stags, scoring in a 1-0 win over Balestier Khalsa in the season opener, bringing his goal tally for the club to 7 goals in 8 games. He developed a reputation as a clinical finisher with 25 goals in 35 games over his first two seasons. However, the 2022 Season saw Kopitovic flourish even further, notching 12 assists and 31 goals with 2 games left to play, going neck-to-neck with Kodai Tanaka in the challenge for the Golden Boot award. He finished the season as the top goalscorer in the league, ending the season with 35 goals in 28 games.

Career statistics

Club

Honours

Club

Tampines Rovers
 Singapore Community Shield: 2020

Individual 

 Singapore Premier League Golden Boot: 2022

References 

1995 births
Living people
Association football forwards
Montenegrin footballers
OFK Petrovac players
OFK Titograd players
FK Kom players
Tampines Rovers FC players
Montenegrin First League players
Singapore Premier League players
Montenegrin expatriate footballers
Expatriate footballers in Singapore
Montenegrin expatriate sportspeople in Singapore